The origin and usage of the term metalloid is convoluted. Its origin lies in attempts, dating from antiquity, to describe metals and to distinguish between typical and less typical forms. It was first applied to metals that floated on water (lithium, sodium and potassium), and then more popularly to nonmetals. Only recently, since the mid-20th century, has it been widely used to refer to elements with intermediate or borderline properties between metals and nonmetals.

Pre-1800

Ancient conceptions of metals as solid, fusible and malleable substances can be found in Plato's Timaeus (c. 360 BCE) and Aristotle's Meteorology.

More sophisticated classification arrangements were proposed by Pseudo-Geber (in the Geber corpus, c. 1310), Paracelsus (De Natura Rerum libri nonem, 1525–6; and later works), Basil Valentine (Conclusiones, 1624), and Boerhaave (Elementa Chemiæ, 1733). They attempted to separate the more characteristic metals from substances having those characteristics to a lesser degree. Such substances included zinc, antimony, bismuth, stibnite, pyrite and galena. These were all then called semimetals or bastard metals.

In 1735 Brandt proposed to make the presence or absence of malleability the principle of this classification. On that basis he separated mercury from the metals. The same view was adopted by Vogel (1755, Institutiones Chemiæ) and Buffon (1785, Histoire Naturelle des Minéraux). In the interim, Braun had observed the solidification of mercury by cold in 1759–60. This was confirmed by Hutchins and Cavendish in 1783. The malleability of mercury then became known, and it was included amongst the metals.

In 1789 Fourcroy highlighted the weakness of this distinction between metals and semimetals. He said it was evident from the fact that

between the extreme malleability of gold and the singular fragility of arsenic, other metals presented only imperceptible gradations of this character, and because there was probably no greater difference between the malleability of gold and that of lead, which was considered to be a metal, than there was between lead and zinc, which was classed among semi-metals, while in the substances intermediate between zinc and arsenic the differences were slight.

This idea of a semimetal, as a brittle (and thereby imperfect) metal, was gradually discarded after 1789 with the publication of Lavoisier's 'revolutionary'  Elementary Treatise on Chemistry.

1800–1959

In 1800, Pinkerton used the word metalloid, in its literal sense, to describe a mineral variety of pyroxene 'with metallic splendour.' 

In 1808, Erman and Simon suggested using the term metalloid to refer to the newly discovered elements sodium and potassium.  These elements were lighter than water and many chemists did not regard them as proper metals. Erman and Simon's proposal may have been made '[in] an attempt to revive this old distinction between metals and substances resembling metals'. Their suggestion was ignored by the chemical community.

In 1811, Berzelius referred to nonmetallic elements as metalloids, in reference to their ability to form oxyanions. A common oxyanion of sulfur, for example, is the sulfate ion SO. Many metals can do the same. Chromium, for instance, can form the chromate ion CrO. Berzelius' terminology was widely adopted although it was subsequently regarded by some commentators as counterintuitive, misapplied, incorrect or invalid. In 1825, in a revised German edition of his Textbook of Chemistry, Berzelius subdivided the metalloids into three classes. These were: constantly gaseous 'gazolyta' (hydrogen, nitrogen, oxygen); real metalloids (sulfur, phosphorus, carbon, boron, silicon); and salt-forming 'halogenia' (fluorine, chlorine, bromine, iodine).

In 1844, Jackson gave the meaning of 'metalloid' as 'like metals, but wanting some of their properties.' In 1845, in A dictionary of science, literature and art, Berzelius' classification of the elementary bodies was represented as: I. gazolytes; II. halogens; III. metalloids ('resemble the metals in certain aspects, but are in others widely different'); and IV. metals.

In 1864, calling nonmetals 'metalloids' was still sanctioned 'by the best authorities' even though this did not always seem appropriate. The greater propriety of applying the word metalloid to other elements, such as arsenic, had been considered.

By as early as 1866 some authors were instead using the term nonmetal, rather than metalloid, to refer to nonmetallic elements. In 1875, Kemshead observed that the elements had been subdivided into two classes—'non-metals or metalloids, and metals.' He added that '[t]he former term, although not so convenient, because a compound word, is more correct, and is now universally employed.'

In 1876, Tilden protested against, 'the [still] too common though illogical practice of giving the name metalloid to such bodies as oxygen, chlorine or fluorine'. He instead divided the elements into ('basigenic') true metals, metalloids ('imperfect metals') and ('oxigenic') nonmetals.

As late as 1888, classifying the elements into metals, metalloids, and nonmetals, rather than metals and metalloids, was still regarded as peculiar and potentially confusing.

Beach, writing in 1911, explained it this way:

Metalloid (Gr. "metal-like"), in chemistry, any nonmetallic element. There are 13, namely, sulfur, phosphorus, fluorin[e], chlorin[e], iodine, bromine, silicon, boron, carbon, nitrogen, hydrogen, oxygen, and selenium. The distinction between the metalloids and the metals is slight. The former, excepting selenium and phosphorus, do not have a "metallic" lustre; they are poorer conductors of heat and electricity, are generally not reflectors of light and not electropositive; that is, no metalloid fails of all these tests. The term seems to have been introduced into modern usage instead of nonmetals for the very reason that there is no hard and fast line between metals and nonmetals, so that "metal-like" or "resembling metals" is a better description of the class than the purely negative "nonmetals". Originally it was applied to the nonmetals which are solid at ordinary temperature.

In or around 1917, the Missouri Board of Pharmacy wrote that:

A metal may be said to differ from a metalloid [that is, a nonmetal] in being an excellent conductor of heat and electricity, in reflecting light more or less powerfully and in being electropositive. A metalloid may possess one or more of these characters, but not all of them ... Iodine is most commonly given as an example of a metalloid because of its metallic appearance.

During the 1920s the two meanings of the word metalloid appeared to be undergoing a transition in popularity. Writing in A Dictionary of Chemical Terms, Couch defined 'metalloid' as an old, obsolescent term for 'nonmetal.'  In contrast, Webster's New International Dictionary noted that use of the term metalloid to refer to nonmetals was the norm. Its application to elements resembling the typical metals in some way only, such as arsenic, antimony and tellurium, was recorded merely on a 'sometimes' basis.

Use of the term metalloid subsequently underwent a period of great flux up to 1940. Consensus as to its application to intermediate or borderline elements did not occur until the ensuing years, between 1940 and 1960.

In 1947, Pauling included a reference to metalloids in his classic and influential textbook, General chemistry: An introduction to descriptive chemistry and modern chemical theory. He described them as 'elements with intermediate properties ... occupy[ing] a diagonal region [on the periodic table], which includes boron, silicon, germanium, arsenic, antimony, tellurium, and polonium.'

In 1959 the International Union of Pure and Applied Chemistry (IUPAC) recommended that '[t]he word metalloid should not be used to denote nonmetals' although it was still being used in this sense (around that time) by, for example, the French.

1960–present
In 1969 the classic and authoritative Hackh's Chemical Dictionary included entries for both 'metalloid' and 'semimetal'. The latter term was described as obsolete.

In 1970 IUPAC recommended abandoning the term metalloid because of its continuing inconsistent use in different languages. They suggested using the terms metal, semimetal and nonmetal instead. Despite this recommendation, use of the term 'metalloid' increased dramatically. Google Ngram Viewer showed a fourfold increase in the use of the word 'metalloid' (as compared to 'semimetal') in the American English corpus from 1972 to 1983. There was a sixfold increase in the British English corpus from 1976 to 1983. As at 2011, the difference in usage across the English corpus was around 4:1 in favour of 'metalloid'.

The most recent IUPAC publications on chemical nomenclature (the "Red Book", 2005)  and terminology (the "Gold Book", 2006–)  do not include any recommendations as to the usage or non-usage of the terms metalloid or semimetal.

Use of the term semimetal, rather than metalloid, has recently been discouraged. This is because the former term 'has a well defined and quite distinct meaning in physics'. In physics, a semimetal is an element or a compound in which the valence band marginally (rather than substantially) overlaps the conduction band. This results in only a small number of effective charge carriers. Thus, the densities of charge carriers in the elemental semimetals carbon (as graphite, in the direction of its planes), arsenic, antimony and bismuth are 3 cm−3, 2  cm−3, 5 cm−3 and 3 cm−3 respectively. In contrast, the room-temperature concentration of electrons in metals usually exceeds 1022 cm−3.

References to 'metalloid' as being outdated have also been described as 'nonsense' noting that 'it accurately describes these weird in-between elements'.

Notes

Citations

References

American Chemical Society California section 1969, book review of Hackh's chemical dictionary (4th ed.), The Vortex, vol. 30–31
American Institute of Chemists 1969, book review of Hackh's chemical dictionary (4th ed.), The Chemist, vol. 46
Atkins P, Overton T, Rourke J, Weller M & Armstrong F 2010, Shriver & Atkins' inorganic chemistry, 5th ed., Oxford University Press, Oxford, 
Bache AD 1832, An essay on chemical nomenclature, prefixed to the treatise on chemistry; by J. J. Berzelius, American Journal of Science, vol. 22, pp. 248–277
Beach FC (ed.) 1911, The Americana: A universal reference library, Scientific American Compiling Department, New York, vol. XIII, Mel–New
Berzelius JJ 1811, 'Essai sur la nomenclature chimique', Journal de Physique, de Chimie, d'Histoire Naturelle, vol. LXXIII, pp. 253‒286 
Berzelius JJ 1825, Lehrbuch der chemie (Textbook of chemistry), vol. 1, pt. 1, trans. F Wöhle, Arnold, Dresden
Brande WT & Cauvin J 1845, A dictionary of science, literature and art, Harper & Brothers, New York
Cornford FM 1937, Plato's cosmology: the Timaeus of Plato translated with a running commentary by Francis Macdonald Cornford, Routledge and Kegan Paul, London
Couch JF 1920, A dictionary of chemical terms, D Van Nostrand, New York
Feng & Jin 2005, Introduction to condensed matter physics: Volume 1, World Scientific, Singapore, 
Fourcory AF 1789, Elémens d'histoire naturelle et de chimie, 3rd ed., vol. 2, Cuchet, Paris
Friend JN 1953, Man and the chemical elements, 1st ed., Charles Scribner's Sons, New York
Glinka N 1959, General chemistry, Foreign Languages Publishing House, Moscow
Goldsmith RH 1982, 'Metalloids', Journal of Chemical Education, vol. 59, no. 6, pp. 526–527, 
Grant J 1969, Hackh's chemical dictionary [American and British usage], 4th ed., McGraw-Hill, New York, 
Gray T 2010, 'Metalloids (7)'
Greenberg A 2007, From alchemy to chemistry in picture and story, John Wiley & Sons, Hoboken, NJ
Hérold A 2006, 'An arrangement of the chemical elements in several classes inside the periodic table according to their common properties', Comptes Rendus Chimie, vol. 9, pp. 148–153, 
IUPAC 1959, Nomenclature of inorganic chemistry, 1st ed., Butterworths, London
IUPAC 1971, Nomenclature of inorganic chemistry, 2nd ed., Butterworths, London
IUPAC 2005, Nomenclature of inorganic chemistry (the "Red Book"), NG Connelly & T Damhus eds, RSC Publishing, Cambridge, 
IUPAC 2006–, Compendium of chemical terminology (the "Gold Book"), 2nd ed., by M Nic, J Jirat & B Kosata, with updates compiled by A Jenkins, 
Jackson CT 1844, Final report of the geology and mineralogy of the State of New Hampshire, with contributions towards the improvement of agriculture and metallurgy, Carroll & Baker, Concord, New Hampshire
Jorpes JE 1970, Jac. Berzelius: his life and work, trans. B Steele, University of California, Berkeley
Kemshead WB 1875, Inorganic chemistry, William Collins, Sons, & Company, London
Lovett DR 1977, Semimetals & narrow-bandgap semi-conductors, Pion, London, 
Lundgren A & Bensaude-Vincent B 2000, [https://books.google.com/books?id=9Wki6iUlkvUC&pg=PA409 Communicating chemistry: textbooks and their audiences, 1789–1939], Science History, Canton, MA, 
Mayo CA (ed.) 1917, 'Board questions and answers: Questions asked by the Missouri Board of Pharmacy, with correct answers', American Druggist and Pharmaceutical Record, vol. 65, no. 4, April, pp. 53–56
Obrist B 1990, Constantine of Pisa. The book of the secrets of alchemy: a mid-13th century survey of natural science, E J Brill, Leiden, The Netherlands
Oxford English Dictionary 1989, 2nd ed., Oxford University, Oxford
Partington JR 1961, A history of chemistry, vol. 2, Macmillan, London
Partington JR 1964, A history of chemistry, vol. 4, Macmillan, London
Paul BH 1865, 'Metals and metallöids', in H Watts (ed.), A dictionary of chemistry and the allied branches of other science, vol. 3, Longman, Green, Roberts & Green, London, pp. 933–946
Pauling L 1947, General chemistry: An introduction to descriptive chemistry and modern chemical theory, WH Freeman, San Francisco
Pinkerton J 1800, Petralogy. A treatise on rocks, vol. 2, White, Cochrane, and Co., London
Roscoe HE & Schorlemmer FRS 1894, A treatise on chemistry: Volume II: The metals, D Appleton, New York
Salzberg HW 1991, From caveman to chemist: Circumstances and achievements, American Chemical Society, Washington DC, p. 204, 
Sólyom J 2008, [https://books.google.com/books?id=XSo-a2n43xEC&pg=PA91 p. 91 Fundamentals of the physics of solids: Electronic properties], Springer-Verlag, Berlin, 
Strathern P 2000, Mendeleyev's dream: The quest for the elements, Hamish Hamilton, London, 
The Chemical News and Journal of Physical Science 1864, 'Notices of books: Manual of the metalloids', Jan 9, p. 22
The Chemical News and Journal of Physical Science 1888, 'Books received: The students' hand book of chemistry', Jan 6, p. 11
Thomson, T. 1830, The history of chemistry, volumes 1–2, Henry Colburn, and Richard Bentley, London
Tilden WA 1876, Introduction to the study of chemical philosophy, D. Appleton and Co., New York
Tweney CF & Shirshov IP 1935, Hutchinson's technical & scientific encyclopaedia, vol. 3, Macmillan, London
Webster's new international dictionary 1926, 'metalloid', G & C Merriam, Springfield, Mass.
Wilson AH 1939, Semi-conductors & metals: An introduction to the electron theory of metals, Cambridge University, London

Metalloids
Etymologies